Willis S. Blatchley House is a national historic site located at 232 Lee Street, Dunedin, Florida in Pinellas County. It was the house on the American entomologist, malacologist and geologist Willis Blatchley.

It was added to the National Register of Historic Places on September 23, 2009.

References

National Register of Historic Places in Pinellas County, Florida
Buildings and structures in Dunedin, Florida